Baryshnikovo is a rural locality in Polevskoy Selsoviet Rural Settlement, Kursky District, Kursk Oblast, Russia. Population:

Geography 
The village is located on the Seym River (a left tributary of the Desna), 101 km from the Russia–Ukraine border, 23 km south-east of the district center – the town Kursk, 2.5 km from the selsoviet center – Polevaya.

 Climate
Baryshnikovo has a warm-summer humid continental climate (Dfb in the Köppen climate classification).

Transport 
Baryshnikovo is located 7 km from the federal route  (Kursk – Voronezh –  "Kaspy" Highway; a part of the European route ), on the road of regional importance  (R-298 – Polevaya), on the road of intermunicipal significance  (38K-014 – Demino), 3 km from the nearest railway station Polevaya (railway line Klyukva — Belgorod).

The rural locality is situated 22 km from Kursk Vostochny Airport, 109 km from Belgorod International Airport and 187 km from Voronezh Peter the Great Airport.

References

Notes

Sources

Rural localities in Kursky District, Kursk Oblast